It's a Big Big World  is an American children's television series that aired on PBS Kids from January 2, 2006, to January 8, 2010. The series was created by Mitchell Kriegman, the creator of the Muppet television series, Bear in the Big Blue House. After the series ended, reruns continue to air until April 30, 2010. The show revolves around a group of animals living in "The World Tree" in the rainforest along the Amazon River with the Pico da Neblina mountain background. The main character and host is Snook the sloth.

The series was taped at Wainscott Studios (now the LTV (Local TV, Inc.) studios) at the East Hampton Airport industrial complex in Wainscott, New York. The only studio to use Shadowmation, a technique created by Mitchell Kriegman, to bring the puppets to life by combining live action animatronic characters with computer generated animation in real time, high definition virtual environments powered by video game engines.

Characters
 Snook (performed and voiced by Peter Linz) is a pale-throated three-toed sloth who serves as the host of the show. He lives in the world tree and loves nothing more than to help his friends learn all about the 'Big Big World' around them. He's slow-moving (but smart) and often takes naps, but is always up for a scientific investigation. He also enjoys singing and dancing with all of his friends in the World Tree. In addition to interacting with the other characters, Snook regularly breaks the fourth wall, often to explain a fact or ask a question. Like Big Bird from Sesame Street or Bear from Bear in the Big Blue House, Snook is a full-bodied character, as well as one of the only two not requiring 3 performers, the other being Madge.
 Burdette (performed and voiced by Melissa Creighton) is a crested quetzal bird who sometimes seems like a controlling older sister, who thinks she knows more than everyone around her. However, Burdette is sincere, and while investigating things with her friends in the World Tree, she's sometimes surprised to learn new things about herself too.
 Bob (performed and voiced by James Godwin) is a southern tamandua who loves studying the ants that live all around him in the World Tree, and he's always trying new things out to make them like him more. Bob also worries a lot about things that he thinks might happen.
 Smooch (performed and voiced by Aimee Garcia) and Winslow (performed and voiced by Tyler Bunch) are two playful sibling monkeys - common marmosets to be exact - who're always stirring things up. Smooch (the girl monkey) is always trying to figure out the mysteries of the world around her, and Winslow (the boy monkey) is the goofy creative thinker. With such different personalities, these two monkeys don't always see eye to eye, but their little disagreements frequently lead to great adventures.
 Madge (performed and voiced by Julie Westwood) is an old yellow-footed tortoise. Madge has a map of the world on her shell. She's the oldest and wisest creature in the World Tree, and the one everyone comes to when they have a problem to solve. She traveled all over the world and shares her experiences with everyone. Her library is the place to visit for answers to scientific questions. Like Snook, Madge is a full-bodied character. Madge disappears in Season 2. However, in one Season 2 episode, Snook mentions her name (which is in one of the final two episodes; in Big Book of Babies). 
 Oko (performed and voiced by Peter Linz) is an old brown howler and a trickster who always shows up when least expected. Oko can be grouchy and mischievous, but he also shares mysterious stories and little bits of wisdom with the others. A tai chi master, he carries an old walking stick that he can twirl from his feet to his hands and back again in the blink of an eye. He has a friend named Tsetse, who sometimes gives good advice. Oko disappears in Season 2.
 Wartz (performed and voiced by Tim Lagasse) is a red-eyed tree frog. Wartz has gone through his metamorphosis, growing from a tadpole into a frog. Best friends with Smooch and Winslow, Wartz wants to get along with everyone and will agree with anyone, no matter what they're saying. He was written off from the show in Season 2, but he can still be seen in the theme song. He provides all of the comic relief moments in the series until Riona replaces him for that.
 Ick (performed and voiced by Tim Lagasse) is a redtail catfish who lives in the pond under the world tree. He has misanthropic tendencies, as shown through his love of playing pranks on whoever he comes across. Although Ick disappears in Season 2, his pond still remains in the theme song and in some Season 2 episodes.
 Riona (performed by Tyler Bunch) is Snook's niece who is a baby sloth that serves as the co-host of Season 2 and provides all of the comic relief moments in that season (replacing Wartz).

Puppeteers
 Peter Linz as Snook/Oko
 Melissa Creighton as Burdette
 Aimee Garcia as Smooch
 Tyler Bunch as Winslow/Riona
 James Godwin as Bob
 Tim Lagasse as Ick/Wartz
 Julie Westwood as Madge

Additional puppetry was provided by Patrick Holmes, Carol Binion, Frankie Cordiro, Eric Engelhardt, Jim Kroupa, Paul McGinnis, John Kennedy, Jodi Eichelberger, Heather Asch, Amanda Maddock, David Jordan, and Lara MacLean.

Many of the puppeteers come from similar shows, primarily Bear in the Big Blue House, Jellybean Jungle, and The Book of Pooh, another show involving Shadowmation, a technique that combines live-action, bunraku-style puppetry, and computer-generated animation.

Episodes

Series overview

Typical episode format
Each episode begins with the opening theme song, "It's a Big Big World" that's followed by a short (10-12 minute) story involving some or all of the main characters. In season 1, this first story was followed by another song, called "Curve of the World", sung by all the characters. (In the Miss Lori and Hooper block, this song wasn't shown.) Then comes a second 10-12 minute story, which may be thematically linked to the first story but isn't usually a direct continuation of the plot. In season 2, both stories were followed by Snook singing "Tell Me 'Bout the Best Parts of your Day" to Riona, which led to a discussion about what the characters did and learned that day. At the end of all episodes, Snook sings the closing song, "Try to Touch the Sky", although this is often followed by short segments in which Snook ends an exploring or scientific activity and gives some fun facts about the various species of animals that live in the World Tree.

Season 1 (2006–2007)

Season 2 (2009–2010)

Broadcast
In the United States of America, the show aired on PBS Kids from January 2, 2006 to April 30, 2010, and aired as part of the preschool block from September 4, 2006 to August 31, 2007. 

The show internationally aired on Nick Jr. in Australia, and Nick Jr. 2 in United Kingdom.

Home media

DVD
Six DVDs were released by Sony Pictures Home Entertainment.
The Sky Above (January 30, 2007)
Safe and Sound (May 22, 2007)
Let's Investigate the World 
The Earth Needs You
You Can Do It
The Big Big Sleep

Other DVDs:
Be Healthy and Happy
Everyone's Different

Streaming
Episodes of the show are currently available on YouTube since July 27, 2015. The show was added to Amazon Prime Video on August 12, 2022 after PBS Kids acquired the streaming rights on July 27, 2022, officially marking the program's return to PBS Kids in any platform after 12 years.

References

External links
 
 wainscottstudios.com
 Website
 It's a Big Big World on IMDb

2000s American children's television series
2010s American children's television series
2009 American television series debuts
2013 American television series endings
American preschool education television series
American television series with live action and animation
American television shows featuring puppetry
English-language television shows
2000s preschool education television series
2010s preschool education television series
PBS Kids shows
PBS original programming
Television series by Sony Pictures Television
Television shows set in Brazil